Forest Lawn Memorial Park is a cemetery located in Beaumont, Texas. Multiple notable people are interred there, including baseball players Doug Ault and Bob Marquis, female athlete Babe Didrickson and singer The Big Bopper. It was founded in 1926.

References

External links
 
  – Pine Forest map – 
  – Port Acres map – 

Cemeteries in Texas
Geography of Beaumont, Texas
1926 establishments in Texas